Antonio das Mortes (lit. "The Dragon of Wickedness Against the Holy Warrior") is a 1969 Brazilian western film directed by Glauber Rocha. It is often cited as the last installment of Rocha's film trilogy, preceded by Black God, White Devil and Entranced Earth. It features return of the character Antonio das Mortes, now as the protagonist, again played by Maurício do Valle. The original title is a reference to the tale of Saint George and the Dragon.

Plot
After the World War II, in the Brazilian sertão. A group of impoverished peasant mystics (beatos) gathered around Dona Santa (Rosa Maria Penna), a female spiritual figure, join in veneration of Saint George with an obscure figure named Coirana (Lorival Pariz). Coirana claims to have restarted the cangaço and seeks to take the revenge of Lampião and other cangaceiro martyrs, presenting the tale of Saint George and the Dragon in a contemporary class conflict context. They threaten the town of Jardim de Piranhas governed by Coronel Horácio (Joffre Soares) a blind and old cattle owner married to younger and attractive Laura (Odete Lara). Dr. Mattos (Hugo Carvana), the corrupt police chief of the town, hires Antônio das Mortes as a jagunço against Coirana and Antônio fatally wounds Coirana in a duel. However, Antônio is changed by his experiences with the poor, and so he then demands that the coronel distribute the food stored in a warehouse to the remaining cangaceiros. The colonel raged and sent Mata Vaca (Vinícius Salvatori) to kill Antônio das Mortes. But Antônio das Mortes with the help of his friend "Professor" (Othon Bastos) kills Mata Vaca and his jagunços. The coronel is killed by Antão (Mário Gusmão), the helper and possibly lover of Dona Santa in a scene reminiscent of Saint George slaying the Dragon iconography. The movie ends with Antônio das Mortes walking by the roadside, carrying on the struggle - in some ways hopeless or unending - which extends beyond the killing of the colonel and the expropriation of his land.

Cast
 Maurício do Valle - Antônio das Mortes
 Odete Lara - Laura
 Othon Bastos - Professor
 Hugo Carvana - Dr. Mattos
 Joffre Soares - Coronel Horácio
 Lorival Pariz - Coirana
 Rosa Maria Penna - Dona Santa
 Vinícius Salvatori - Mata Vaca
 Mário Gusmão - Antão
 Emmanuel Cavalcanti - Priest
 Santi Scaldaferri - Batista
 Conceição Senna - Waitress
 Paulo Lima

Awards
Rocha won the award for Best Director at the 1969 Cannes Film Festival. It was chosen by the Ministry of Culture to represent Brazil in the 42nd Academy Awards, but was not nominated for Best Foreign Language Film.

Soundtrack 

 Antonio das Mortes, written & performed by Sérgio Ricardo
 Carinhoso, written by Pixinguinha & João de Barro, performed by Odete Lara & Hugo Carvana
 Coirana, written by Walter Queiroz, performed by Lorival Pariz
 Volta por Cima, written by Paulo Vanzolini
 Ukrinmakrinkrin, for soprano, wind instruments, and piano, composed by Marlos Nobre

See also
 List of submissions to the 42nd Academy Awards for Best Foreign Language Film
 List of Brazilian submissions for the Academy Award for Best Foreign Language Film

References

External links
 
 

1969 Western (genre) films
1969 films
Brazilian Western (genre) films
1960s Portuguese-language films
Films directed by Glauber Rocha
Films set in Brazil
Brazilian sequel films
Color sequels of black-and-white films
Films about cangaço